The following radio stations broadcast on AM frequency 810 kHz: 810 AM is a United States clear-channel frequency. KGO San Francisco and WGY Schenectady share Class A status on 810 AM.

In Argentina 
 Federal in Buenos Aires
 Mitre in Cordoba

In Australia 
 2BA in Bega, NSW
 6RN in Perth, WA

In the Bahamas 
 C6B-3-AM (still identifies as ZNS-3-AM) in Freeport

In the People's Republic of China 
 BEN49 in Xian

In Colombia 
 HJCY in Bogotá, Distrito Capital

In Denmark

In Greenland 
 OYN in Upernavik

In Fiji 
 3DX in Labasa

In India 
 VUR in Rajkot

In Indonesia 
 PM3B in Bandung 
 PM8DBD in Enrekang 
 PM2B in Jakarta 
 PM3BIS in Majalengka 
 8FW210 in Merauke 
 PM3CEC in Tanjung Balai

In Japan 
 JOKN in Tokyo (Yokota Air Base)

In Mexico 
 XEAGR-AM in Acapulco, Guerrero
 XECSAA-AM in Cuernavaca, Morelos
 XEEMM-AM in Salamanca, Guanajuato
 XEFW-AM in Tampico, Tamaulipas
 XEHT-AM in Huamantla, Tlaxcala
 XERB-AM in Cozumel, Quintana Roo
 XERSV-AM in Cd. Obregón, Sonora

In New Zealand 
 ZL1XD in East Tamaki
 ZL4YA in Highcliff, Shiel Hill

In North Macedonia 
 Radio Skopje in Skopje

In Papua New Guinea 
 P2RB in Rabaul

In the Philippines 
DZRJ-AM in Makati

In the Russian Federation 
 RW34 in Volgograd
 RW439 in Yekaterinburg
 RW637 in Vladivostok

In Spain 
 EAJ7 in Madrid

In South Korea 
 MBC in Deagu

In Thailand 
 HSKJ-AM in Khon Kaen
 HSLC-AM in Trang

In the United Kingdom 
 G2BD in Redmoss
 G5SC in Westerglen

In the United States 
Stations in bold are clear-channel stations.

In Uruguay 
 CX 14 El Espectador in Montevideo

References

Lists of radio stations by frequency